This article describes the qualification for the 2022 European Women's Handball Championship.

Qualification system
32 teams registered for participation and competed for twelve places at the final tournament in two distinct qualification phases. The group winners of phase 1 advanced to phase 2. The 24 teams were then divided into six groups of four teams with the top two teams of each group qualifying for the final tournament.

Qualification Phase 1
The draw took place on 17 March 2021.

All times are UTC+2.

Seeding
The eleven teams were seeded in four pots.

Group 1

Group 2

Group 3

Qualification Phase 2
The draw took place on 25 March 2021.

Seeding
The 24 teams were seeded in four pots.

Matchdays 1,2,5 and 6 are UTC+2, matchday 3 and 4 are UTC+1.

Group 1

Group 2

Group 3

Group 4

Group 5

Group 6

Notes

References

Qualification
Europe Women's Championship qualification
Sports events affected by the 2022 Russian invasion of Ukraine